Parcours Ignace-Bourget is a 12-hole disc golf course located in Ignace-Bourget Park in Montreal, Quebec. The course was established on 24 September 2009. It ranks among the most played disc golf courses in Quebec.

Course details 
It sports concrete tee pads and twelve Innova DISCatcher baskets. Parcours Ignace-Bourget can be played for free and is open year-round, but holes 6 and 7 are not available during the winter months.

Tournaments 
As one of the home courses of the Association Disc Golf Montreal (ADGM) together with Parcours Île Charron, the course hosted the unsanctioned Championnat ADGM in 2009.

See also 
 List of disc golf courses in Quebec

References

External links 

 
 Official Summer and Winter maps
 Parc Ignace Bourget on DG Course Review
 Parcours Ignace-Bourget on the PDGA course directory

Disc golf courses in Quebec